Andrew David Tennant (born 9 March 1987) is an English former professional track and road racing cyclist, who rode professionally between 2009 and 2021 for six different teams. During his career, Tennant won seven medals at the UCI Track Cycling World Championships, six gold medals at the UEC European Track Championships and a silver medal at the 2014 Commonwealth Games.

Biography
Born in Wolverhampton, West Midlands, UK, Tennant began to make his mark on the cycling world as a junior rider. In 2005 he was selected for British Cycling's Olympic Development Programme and lived in Tuscany, Italy with the GB squad in 2006. Tennant represented England in the points race at the 2006 Commonwealth Games and represented Great Britain in the Under-23 road race at the 2006 UCI Road World Championships in Salzburg, Austria. The following season he overtrained, and his results suffered as a consequence. Tennant was a member of British Cycling's Olympic Academy.

Whilst riding for Team Halfords Bikehut in 2009, he was mentored by Rob Hayles.

In 2015 Tennant moved to the new  team set up by Bradley Wiggins aiming to prepare British riders for the team pursuit at the 2016 Summer Olympics.

Major results

Track

2005
 UCI Junior Track World Championships
1st  Individual pursuit
2nd  Team pursuit
 1st  Team pursuit, UEC European Junior Track Championships
 1st  Individual pursuit, National Junior Track Championships
2006
 1st  Team pursuit, UEC European Under-23 Track Championships
 1st Stuttgart round, UIV Cup (with Ian Stannard)
 3rd  Team pursuit, 2005–06 UCI Track Cycling World Cup Classics, Sydney
2007
 1st  Team pursuit, National Track Championships
 3rd  Team pursuit, 2006–07 UCI Track Cycling World Cup Classics, Manchester
2008
 1st  Team pursuit, UEC European Under-23 Track Championships
2009
 Team pursuit, 2009–10 UCI Track Cycling World Cup Classics
1st  Manchester
2nd  Melbourne
 National Track Championships
2nd Individual pursuit
2nd Points race
2010
 1st  Team pursuit, UEC European Track Championships
 2nd  Team pursuit, UCI Track World Championships
 3rd  Team pursuit, 2010–11 UCI Track Cycling World Cup Classics, Melbourne
2011
 1st  Team pursuit, UEC European Track Championships
 3rd  Team pursuit, UCI Track World Championships
2012
 1st  Team pursuit, UCI Track World Championships
2013
 1st  Team pursuit, UEC European Track Championships
 1st  Team pursuit, 2013–14 UCI Track Cycling World Cup, Manchester
 2nd  Team pursuit, UCI Track World Championships
2014
 UEC European Track Championships
1st  Team pursuit
1st  Individual pursuit
 Team pursuit, 2014–15 UCI Track Cycling World Cup
1st  London
2nd  Guadalajara
 British National Track Championships
1st  Individual pursuit
1st  Madison (with Oliver Wood)
 2nd  Team pursuit, Commonwealth Games
2015
 1st  Team pursuit, UEC European Track Championships
 1st  Individual pursuit, British National Track Championships
 1st Revolution Series Round 2 (with Iljo Keisse)
 2nd  Team pursuit, UCI Track World Championships
 2nd  Individual pursuit, 2015–16 UCI Track Cycling World Cup, Cali
2016
 1st  Team pursuit, 2016–17 UCI Track Cycling World Cup, Glasgow
 UCI Track World Championships
2nd  Team pursuit
3rd  Individual pursuit

Road

2006
 3rd Overall Flèche du Sud
2008
 2nd Road race, National Under-23 Road Championships
2009
 1st  Overall Tour of the Reservoir
 2nd Time trial, National Under-23 Road Championships
 2nd Overall Girvan Three Day
 7th Overall Cinturón a Mallorca
2011
 1st Richmond Grand Prix
 9th Overall Tour de Korea
 10th London–Surrey Cycle Classic
2015
 1st Wiltshire GP
 1st Stage 2 Flèche du Sud
 2nd Milk Race
 3rd Overall Tour of the Reservoir
 5th London Nocturne
2018
 1st Durham, Tour Series

References

External links
Team GB profile

1987 births
Living people
English male cyclists
Cyclists at the 2006 Commonwealth Games
Sportspeople from Wolverhampton
UCI Track Cycling World Champions (men)
Cyclists at the 2014 Commonwealth Games
Commonwealth Games silver medallists for England
Commonwealth Games medallists in cycling
English track cyclists
Medallists at the 2014 Commonwealth Games